IOI Corporation Berhad commonly referred to as IOI, was incorporated on 31 October 1969 as Industrial Oxygen Incorporated Sdn Bhd. IOI is one of Malaysia's biggest conglomerates. It ventured into property development in 1984, followed by oil palm plantations and refineries in 1985. IOI was listed on the Kuala Lumpur Stock Exchange (KLSE) and trading as MYX: 1961—now known as Bursa Malaysia—in 1980.

The group was headed by Lee Shin Cheng, the executive chairman, until his death. Lee Yeow Chor is CEO.

, IOI Group employed more than 30,000 persons from more than 25 countries.

IOI Group's fiscal year runs from 1 July YYYY to 30 June of the following year.

Core businesses

Palm oil plantations
Palm oil plantations are IOI's biggest income generator. As of 2015, about 67 percent of the conglomerate's profits came from its oil palm plantations. The group controls 230,000 hectares of oil palm plantations in Malaysia and  Indonesia. It has 15 palm oil mills with a total milling capacity of 4.75 million tonnes of FFB (fresh fruit bunches) per year from its 90 estates throughout Malaysia and Indonesia.

With oil yield of some six tonnes per hectare per year at its mature estates, IOI is the most efficient plantation company in the world. Malaysia's oil palm average yield for the last 20 years has been stagnant at four tonnes per hectare per year.

Nestlé stopped buying palm oil from IOI in 2012. The United Nations Environment Programme says palm oil production is the leading cause of deforestation, which is occurring at a rate of about two per cent per year. Indonesia is also the world's third-largest carbon emitter, largely as a result of deforestation and the burning of peatlands.

Real estate
IOI develops real estate and makes property investments. Two resort hotels in Putrajaya, the Marriott Putrajaya Hotel and the Palm Garden Hotel belong to the IOI Group. The property segment contributes around 18 per cent of the group's earnings. Mari Home Marketing is the appointed real estate agency by IOI to market its properties in Malaysia market.

Oleochemicals and speciality fats
IOI is the largest vegetable oil-based oleochemical manufacturer in Asia—held under wholly owned entities IOI Oleochemical Industries Bhd and Pan Century Oleochemical Sdn Bhd with a combined capacity of over 750,000 tonnes per annum. In 2021, IOI was ranked 8th on the Global Top 30 Specialty Oil Companies list.

These plants produce fatty acids and esters, glycerine, soap noodles, fatty alcohols, and metallic strearates. These have various industrial applications in the production of food, pharmaceutical, cosmetics, personal care, home care, industrial detergent-surfactants and lubricant products.

IOI's speciality fats businesses are operated by IOI Loders Croklaan, with manufacturing facilities in the Netherlands, North America, and in Malaysia (with a combined production capacity of more than a million tonnes per year). Loders Croklaan's customer base includes global food giants like Unilever, Nestle, Cadbury and Kraft. Speciality fats are used in pastries, confectionery, snack foods, and ready-to-eat meals.

Refineries
IOI owns refineries in the US and the Netherlands. IOI extended its activities to Indonesia in 2005. Its associate company in Indonesia is Bumitama Gunajaya Agro. On 27 September 2016, Greenpeace blockaded the IOI refinery in the Netherlands in order to force IOI to adopt a more sustainable plantation policy.

Critics

Environmental and civil organizations have criticized IOI Group. Greenpeace first documented the destruction of orangutan habitat and peatland forest in the 2008 report Burning up Borneo, followed by a second report in 2015, Under Fire. The company also faced allegations in 2014 from Finnish NGO Finnwatch of serious labour issues on its Malaysian plantations, including confiscating workers' passports, providing contracts in language workers could not understand, restricting freedom of association and paying salaries below the minimum wage.

IOI is a co-founder of the Roundtable on Sustainable Palm Oil (RSPO) and has played an active role in shaping the scheme. The company has several of its estates in Malaysia certified as complying with RSPO standards. According to Friends of the Earth in March 2010, IOI Corporation failed to live up to its claims of green stewardship. For example:

Plantation development took place in forest lands without approval of the Ministry of Forestry in conflict with the Indonesian legislation
  Plantation development took place without approved environmental impact assessments
  Fraudulent statements were made
 Encroachment has taken place in forests and peatlands
 There is a significant increase in fire hot spots
 Corporate claim not to use peatland but to circumvent the issue it does not consider coastal or shallow peat as peatland.
 Corporate claim not to use "burning policy". According to the Fire Information for Management System (FIRMS), there was a significant increase in the number of hot spots after land clearing activity started in 2009.
  IOI's current land development activities may trigger significant land conflicts.

After a complaint filed by AidEnvironment in April 2015, the RSPO certificates of the IOI Group are suspended as of 1 April 2016. Since then, many consumer companies like Unilever, Nestlé and Mars have cancelled contracts with the company. IOI was reinstated in August 2016 by RSPO after it was judged to have fulfilled the group's demands to improve its environmental performance. In September 2016, Greenpeace published a damning indictment of IOI entitled, A Deadly Trade-Off; IOI's Palm Oil Supply and its Human and Environmental Costs.

References

External links
 

1969 establishments in Malaysia
Conglomerate companies of Malaysia
Agriculture companies of Malaysia
Palm oil companies of Malaysia
Palm oil companies of Indonesia
Real estate in Malaysia
Conglomerate companies established in 1969
Real estate companies established in 1969
Agriculture companies established in 1969
Malaysian companies established in 1969
Companies listed on Bursa Malaysia